Robert Schmidt may refer to:

Robert Franz Schmidt (1932–2017), German physiologist and professor emeritus
Robert Hans Schmidt (died 1962), general director of Ford Germany
Robert Schmidt (bobsleigh), bobsledder who competed in the early 1930s
Robert Schmidt (German politician) (1864–1943), leader in the Weimar Republic in the late 1910s and early 1920s
Robert Schmidt (actor) (1882–1941), Danish actor
Robert Schmidt (American football), American football coach in the United States
Robert Schmidt (American politician) (1913–1988), American politician in Wisconsin

See also
Bob Schmidt (disambiguation)